10,000 Buddhas may refer to:

City of Ten Thousand Buddhas, in Ukiah, California
Kek Lok Si Temple, called the  "Pagoda of the Ten-Thousand Buddhas", in Penang, Malaysia
Ten Thousand Buddhas Monastery, in Hong Kong
Yulin Caves, called the "Ten Thousand Buddhas Caves", in Anxi County, Gansu Province, China
Zhenfeng Pagoda, called the "Ten-thousand Buddhas", in Anqing, Anhui Province, China

See also
List of named Buddhas